Zied Ziadi (born 23 September 1990) is a retired Tunisian football midfielder plays for Al-Ahli .

References

1990 births
Living people
Tunisian footballers
Tunisian expatriate footballers
Association football midfielders
Club Africain players
CS Hammam-Lif players
CS Sfaxien players
Al-Muharraq SC players
Al-Nahda Club (Saudi Arabia) players
Al-Ahli Club (Manama) players
Tunisian Ligue Professionnelle 1 players
Bahraini Premier League players
Saudi First Division League players
Expatriate footballers in Bahrain
Tunisian expatriate sportspeople in Bahrain
Expatriate footballers in Saudi Arabia
Tunisian expatriate sportspeople in Saudi Arabia